The noctuid moth genus Lobocheilos, described by George Francis Hampson in 1891, has been renamed Latiphea.

Lobocheilos is a genus of fish in the family Cyprinidae native to Asia.

Species
There are currently 12 recognized species in this genus, although Fishbase places 23 species in the genus. However, a number of these are listed as synonyms of Lobocheilos rhabdoura in the Catalog of Fishes, which also names L. cryptopogon as a synonym of Gymnostomus cryptopogon:

 Lobocheilos bo (Popta, 1904)
 Lobocheilos erinaceus Kottelat & H. H. Tan, 2008
 Lobocheilos falcifer (Valenciennes, 1842)
 Lobocheilos ixocheilos Kottelat & H. H. Tan, 2008
 Lobocheilos kajanensis (Popta, 1904)
 Lobocheilos lehat Bleeker, 1858
 Lobocheilos ovalis Kottelat & H. H. Tan, 2008
 Lobocheilos rhabdoura (Fowler, 1934) 
 Lobocheilos schwanenfeldii Bleeker, 1854
 Lobocheilos tenura Kottelat & H. H. Tan, 2008
 Lobocheilos terminalis Kottelat & H. H. Tan, 2008
 Lobocheilos unicornis Kottelat & H. H. Tan, 2008

References

Cyprinid fish of Asia
Cyprinidae genera
Taxa named by Pieter Bleeker